Ava Deluca-Verley (born September 27, 1989) is a French-American television and film actress who is best known for her role in NBC's comedy series Growing Up Fisher, playing the daughter of Jenna Elfman and J. K. Simmons's characters.

Early life
Deluca-Verley spent most of her childhood living with her family in Winchester, Massachusetts. She began her artistic education at the Walnut Hill School in Natick, Massachusetts, before attending college at Carnegie Mellon School of Drama, graduating in 2012. Her father is from France. She has dual citizenship in France, and speaks French fluently.

Career
Deluca-Verley appeared in Oscar-winning screenwriters Jim Rash and Nat Faxon's directorial debut The Way, Way Back starring Steve Carell, Toni Collette and Sam Rockwell, which sold to Fox Searchlight at Sundance Film Festival in 2013. She has guest starred on TNT's Southland, as well as playing a supporting role in Australian feature film, Blinder.

In 2014, she starred alongside Hugo Becker in the PBS three-hour mini series, The Mystery of Matter: Search for Elements, helmed by Emmy Award-winning director Stephen Lyons.

Filmography

References

External links
 
 

1989 births
Living people
American people of French descent
French television actresses
American television actresses
21st-century French actresses
21st-century American actresses
Actors from Providence, Rhode Island
Actresses from Rhode Island